(Parliamentary) Committee on Health and Welfare (SoU) is a parliamentary committee in the Swedish Riksdag. The committee's main areas of responsibility concern the wellbeing of children and teenagers, care for the elderly and disabled, measures against addiction, and other social services issues. It also debates on policies regarding alcohol, and health care along with social matters in general.

The committee's Speaker is "to be elected" from the Christian Democratic Party, and the vice-Speaker is Fredrik Lundh Sammeli from the Social Democratic Party.

List of speakers for the committee

List of vice-speakers for the committee

References

External links
Riksdag - Socialutskottet (Health and Welfare Committee)

Committees of the Riksdag